The 1960 Arizona Wildcats baseball team represented the University of Arizona in the 1960 NCAA University Division baseball season. The Wildcats played their home games at UA Field. The team was coached by Frank Sancet in his 11th year at Arizona.

The Wildcats won the District VI Playoff to advanced to the College World Series, where they were defeated by the Southern California Trojans.

Roster

Schedule 

! style="" | Regular Season
|- valign="top" 

|- align="center" bgcolor="#ccffcc"
| 1 || March 7 ||  || UA Field • Tucson, Arizona || 8–1 || 1–0 || –
|- align="center" bgcolor="#ccffcc"
| 2 || March 8 || New Mexico || UA Field • Tucson, Arizona || 9–0 || 2–0 || –
|- align="center" bgcolor="#ccffcc"
| 3 || March 11 ||  || UA Field • Tucson, Arizona || 8–3 || 3–0 || –
|- align="center" bgcolor="#ccffcc"
| 4 || March 12 || Pepperdine || UA Field • Tucson, Arizona || 18–4 || 4–0 || –
|- align="center" bgcolor="#ffcccc"
| 5 || March 12 || Pepperdine || UA Field • Tucson, Arizona || 0–2 || 4–1 || –
|- align="center" bgcolor="#ccffcc"
| 6 || March 14 ||  || UA Field • Tucson, Arizona || 13–4 || 5–1 || –
|- align="center" bgcolor="#ccffcc"
| 7 || March 15 || Colorado State || UA Field • Tucson, Arizona || 10–0 || 6–1 || –
|- align="center" bgcolor="#ccffcc"
| 8 || March 18 || Colorado State College || UA Field • Tucson, Arizona || 8–3 || 7–1 || –
|- align="center" bgcolor="#ccffcc"
| 9 || March 19 || Colorado State College || UA Field • Tucson, Arizona || 8–5 || 8–1 || –
|- align="center" bgcolor="#ccffcc"
| 10 || March 19 || Colorado State College || UA Field • Tucson, Arizona || 1–0 || 9–1 || –
|- align="center" bgcolor="#ccffcc"
| 11 || March 21 ||  || UA Field • Tucson, Arizona || 12–2 || 10–1 || 2–0
|- align="center" bgcolor="#ccffcc"
| 12 || March 22 || Utah || UA Field • Tucson, Arizona || 13–2 || 11–1 || 2–0
|- align="center" bgcolor="#ccffcc"
| 13 || March 25 ||  || UA Field • Tucson, Arizona || 12–8 || 12–1 || –
|- align="center" bgcolor="#ffcccc"
| 14 || March 26 || Cal State Los Angeles || UA Field • Tucson, Arizona || 3–9 || 12–2 || –
|- align="center" bgcolor="#ccffcc"
| 15 || March 26 || Cal State Los Angeles || UA Field • Tucson, Arizona || 4–1 || 13–2 || –
|- align="center" bgcolor="#ffcccc"
| 16 || March 28 || San Diego Marines || UA Field • Tucson, Arizona || 6–11 || 13–3 || –
|- align="center" bgcolor="#ccffcc"
| 17 || March 29 || San Diego Marines || UA Field • Tucson, Arizona || 13–1011 || 14–3 || –
|- align="center" bgcolor="#ccffcc"
| 18 || March 30 ||  || UA Field • Tucson, Arizona || 12–9 || 15–3 || –
|- align="center" bgcolor="#ffcccc"
| 19 || March 31 || Michigan || UA Field • Tucson, Arizona || 9–11 || 15–4 || –
|-

|- align="center" bgcolor="#ccffcc"
| 20 || April 1 ||  || UA Field • Tucson, Arizona || 15–3 || 16–4 || –
|- align="center" bgcolor="#ccffcc"
| 21 || April 2 || Wyoming || UA Field • Tucson, Arizona || 15–1 || 17–4 || –
|- align="center" bgcolor="#ccffcc"
| 22 || April 2 || Wyoming || UA Field • Tucson, Arizona || 18–2 || 18–4 || –
|- align="center" bgcolor="#ccffcc"
| 23 || April 4 ||  || UA Field • Tucson, Arizona || 15–6 || 19–4 || –
|- align="center" bgcolor="#ccffcc"
| 24 || April 5 || Sul Ross || UA Field • Tucson, Arizona || 16–5 || 20–4 || –
|- align="center" bgcolor="#ccffcc"
| 25 || April 8 ||  || UA Field • Tucson, Arizona || 13–1 || 21–4 || –
|- align="center" bgcolor="#ccffcc"
| 26 || April 9 || Air Force || UA Field • Tucson, Arizona || 19–7 || 22–4 || –
|- align="center" bgcolor="#ccffcc"
| 27 || April 9 || Air Force || UA Field • Tucson, Arizona || 4–0 || 23–4 || –
|- align="center" bgcolor="#ccffcc"
| 28 || April 11 ||  || UA Field • Tucson, Arizona || 11–5 || 24–4 || –
|- align="center" bgcolor="#ccffcc"
| 29 || April 12 || Iowa || UA Field • Tucson, Arizona || 18–6 || 25–4 || –
|- align="center" bgcolor="#ccffcc"
| 30 || April 13 || Iowa || UA Field • Tucson, Arizona || 23–6 || 26–4 || –
|- align="center" bgcolor="#ccffcc"
| 31 || April 13 || Iowa || UA Field • Tucson, Arizona || 15–1 || 27–4 || –
|- align="center" bgcolor="#ccffcc"
| 32 || April 14 || Iowa || UA Field • Tucson, Arizona || 7–5 || 28–4 || –
|- align="center" bgcolor="#ccffcc"
| 33 || April 16 || Iowa || UA Field • Tucson, Arizona || 10–5 || 29–4 || –
|- align="center" bgcolor="#ffcccc"
| 34 || April 19 || at Wyoming || Cowboy Field • Laramie, Wyoming || 9–10 || 29–5 || –
|- align="center" bgcolor="#ccffcc"
| 35 || April 20 || at Wyoming || Cowboy Field • Laramie, Wyoming || 10–7 || 30–5 || –
|- align="center" bgcolor="#ccffcc"
| 36 || April 21 || at Colorado State || Unknown • Fort Collins, Colorado || 13–8 || 31–5 || –
|- align="center" bgcolor="#ccffcc"
| 37 || April 22 || at Air Force || Falcon Baseball Field • Colorado Springs, Colorado || 16–2 || 32–5 || –
|- align="center" bgcolor="#ccffcc"
| 38 || April 23 || at Air Force || Falcon Baseball Field • Colorado Springs, Colorado || 9–4 || 33–5 || –
|- align="center" bgcolor="#ccffcc"
| 39 || April 25 || at New Mexico || Unknown • Albuquerque, New Mexico || 16–0 || 34–5 || –
|- align="center" bgcolor="#ccffcc"
| 40 || April 26 || at New Mexico || Unknown • Albuquerque, New Mexico || 7–4 || 35–5 || –
|- align="center" bgcolor="#ffcccc"
| 41 || April 30 || at  || Unknown • Tempe, Arizona || 3–7 || 35–6 || 0–1
|- align="center" bgcolor="#ffcccc"
| 42 || April 30 || at Arizona State || Unknown • Tempe, Arizona || 0–3 || 35–7 || 0–.
|-

|- align="center" bgcolor="#ccffcc"
| 43 || May 2 ||  || UA Field • Tucson, Arizona || 11–1 || 36–7 || 0–2
|- align="center" bgcolor="#ccffcc"
| 44 || May 7 || Arizona State || UA Field • Tucson, Arizona || 6–2 || 37–7 || 1–2
|- align="center" bgcolor="#ccffcc"
| 45 || May 7 || Arizona State || UA Field • Tucson, Arizona || 7–6 || 38–7 || 2–2
|-

|-
|-
! style="" | Postseason
|- valign="top"

|- align="center" bgcolor="#ccffcc"
| 46 || June 2 ||  || UA Field • Tucson, Arizona || 4–3 || 39–7 || 2–2
|- align="center" bgcolor="#ccffcc"
| 47 || June 3 || Houston || UA Field • Tucson, Arizona || 6–4 || 40–7 || 2–2
|- align="center" bgcolor="#ccffcc"
| 48 || June 4 || Houston || UA Field • Tucson, Arizona || 5–1 || 41–7 || 2–2
|-

|- align="center" bgcolor="#ccffcc"
| 49 || June 10 || vs Oklahoma State || Omaha Municipal Stadium • Omaha, Nebraska || 2–1 || 42–7 || 2–2
|- align="center" bgcolor="#ffcccc"
| 50 || June 15 || vs Minnesota || Omaha Municipal Stadium • Omaha, Nebraska || 5–8 || 42–8 || 2–2
|- align="center" bgcolor="#ccffcc"
| 51 || June 17 || vs St. John's || Omaha Municipal Stadium • Omaha, Nebraska || 11–4 || 43–8 || 2–2
|- align="center" bgcolor="#ffcccc"
| 52 || June 18 || vs Southern California || Omaha Municipal Stadium • Omaha, Nebraska || 1–13 || 43–9 || 2–2
|-

Awards and honors 
Bill Barraclough
 Third Team All-American American Baseball Coaches Association

Alan Hall
 First Team All-American American Baseball Coaches Association

Charlie Shoemaker
 Second Team All-American American Baseball Coaches Association

Jim Ward
 College World Series All-Tournament Team

References 

Arizona Wildcats baseball seasons
Arizona Wildcats baseball
College World Series seasons
Arizona